The women's 500 metres races of the 2014–15 ISU Speed Skating World Cup 3, arranged in Sportforum Hohenschönhausen, in Berlin, Germany, were held on the weekend of 5–7 December 2014.

Race one was won by Lee Sang-hwa of South Korea, while Heather Richardson of the United States came second, and Margot Boer of the Netherlands came third. Brittany Bowe of the United States won Division B of race one, and was thus, under the rules, automatically promoted to Division A for race two.

In race two, the top two were the same as in race one, Lee and Richardson, while Nao Kodaira of Japan took the bronze. Jang Mi of South Korea won Division B of race two.

Race 1
Race one took place on Friday, 5 December, with Division B scheduled in the morning session, at 13:12, and Division A scheduled in the afternoon session, at 17:04.

Division A

Division B

Race 2
Race two took place on Sunday, 7 December, with Division B scheduled in the morning session, at 09:00, and Division A scheduled in the afternoon session, at 12:50.

Division A

Division B

References

Women 0500
3